Francis Henry Shoemaker (April 25, 1889 – July 24, 1958) was a U.S. Representative from Minnesota.

Early life

Shoemaker was born on a farm in Flora Township, Renville County, Minnesota, and was self-educated with his mother’s assistance. He engaged in agricultural pursuits and worked for many farm and labor organizations. He was a charter member and organizer of the Minnesota Farmer-Labor Party. While Shoemaker was an organizer for the Nonpartisan League in 1920 he was attacked by the pastor of his church as Shoemaker had claimed that despite not being physically fit to enter the army and having a dependent wife was drafted with him being the only married man in the area to be so, but did not appeal the decision. In actuality other married men were drafted, Shoemaker was deemed physically fit, and had filed an appeal to the draft board.

Career

In 1924 he assisted in organizing the Federated Farmer-Labor Party at Chicago in 1924. Shoemaker was nominated for Vice President of the United States, but declined to run. He served as editor and publisher of the People’s Voice, Green Bay Farmer, and Progressive Farmer newspapers in Green Bay, Wisconsin, from 1921 to 1927, and of the Organized Farmer newspaper in Red Wing, Minnesota in 1928. In 1931 he served nine months at Leavenworth penitentiary after being convicted for a federal charge of sending defamatory material through the mail and for violation of his probation.

Shoemaker was elected as a Farmer-Laborite to the 73rd congress. A House vote was held to determine whether or not to seat him and he was permitted retain his seat with 230 votes in his favor against 75 votes. During his tenure Shoemaker filed an impeachment resolution against United States District Judge Joseph W. Molyneaux which amounted to little. He was not a candidate for renomination in 1934 to the 74th congress, but was an unsuccessful candidate for nomination for Minnesota's Senate seat, but lost in the primary to incumbent Henrik Shipstead.

While a sitting member of Congress, he was arrested outside of his House office by two detectives, serving a warrant for assaulting a taxi driver.

Later life

After twenty two years of marriage Shoemaker's wife, Lydgia Schneider, filed for divorce in 1934, due to him openly committing adultery and threatening her. In 1940 Shoemaker was sent to jail for 90 days after assaulting a neighbor and being accused of throwing hot water into his former wife's face. Later he filed to run in the Farmer-Labor primary for Minnesota's seventh congressional district, but came in last place with 11% of the vote.

He then became an unsuccessful Independent candidate for reelection to the 74th congress. After an unsuccessful election campaign in 1942 to the 78th congress, he resumed agricultural pursuits near North Redwood, Minnesota. He died at University of Minnesota Hospitals in Minneapolis on July 24, 1958, and was buried in Zion Cemetery in Flora Township, Renville County, Minnesota.

Electoral history

See also
 List of federal political scandals in the United States

Notes

Sources

External links 
 Francis H. Shoemaker in MNopedia, the Minnesota Encyclopedia 
 A ‘psychopath’ goes to Washington in Minnesota Lawyer 

1889 births
1958 deaths
20th-century American politicians
Businesspeople from Minnesota
Editors of Minnesota newspapers
Editors of Wisconsin newspapers
Farmer–Labor Party members of the United States House of Representatives
Members of the United States House of Representatives from Minnesota
Minnesota Farmer–Laborites
People from Red Wing, Minnesota
People from Redwood Falls, Minnesota
People from Renville County, Minnesota
Politicians from Green Bay, Wisconsin
20th-century American businesspeople